Aenetus ligniveren, the common splendid ghost moth,  is a moth in the family Hepialidae. It is found from southern Queensland to Tasmania.

The wingspan is 50 mm for males and 70 mm for females. Adult males have green forewings with a series of white, diagonal stripes. The hindwings are shiny pale grey. Females have brown wings with variable green patches on the forewings. Adults emerge in early summer.

The larvae have been recorded feeding on Acacia, Acmena, Callistemon, Dodonaea, Eucalyptus, Lantana, Leptospermum, Lophostemon, Malus, Melaleuca, Olearia, Pomaderris, Prostanthera and Rubus species. Newly hatched larvae bore horizontally into the stems of their host plants and then downwards to make vertical tunnels. They cover the opening of the tunnel with silk and wood fragments. They are pale yellow with a dark brown head. They feed on the bark and emerge only by night. Pupation takes place in the tunnel, near the opening.

References

See also
Aenetus eximia

Moths described in 1805
Hepialidae